The National Theatre and Dance Museum is a museum in Lisbon, Portugal.

References

External links
Official website 
The National Theatre and Dance Museum on Google Arts & Culture

Museums in Lisbon
Theatre in Portugal
Theatre museums